Parviturbo tuberculosus is a species of minute sea snail, a marine gastropod mollusk in the family Skeneidae.

Description
The size of the shell attains 2.5 mm.

Distribution
This marine species occurs in the Caribbean Sea, off Jamaica, Venezuela and the Virgin Islands at a depth of 6 m.

References

 d'Orbigny, A. 1842. Mollusques. Histoire Physique, Politique et Naturelle de l'île de Cuba 2: 1-112, pls. 10-21?. Arthus Bertrand: Paris. 
 Weisbord, N. E. 1962. Late Cenozoic gastropods from northern Venezuela. Bulletins of American Paleontology 42(193): 672 pp., 48 pls.

External links
 Orbigny A. d' (1842-1853). Mollusques. Vol 2: 1-380 [pp. 1-112, 1842; pp. 113-128, 1844; pp. 129-224, 1847; pp. 225-380, 1853]. In: Sagra, R. de la (ed.). Histoire physique, politique et naturelle de l'Ile de Cuba. Arthus Bertrand, Paris (mentioned as binomen Delphinula tuberculosa under subgenus Delphinula of genus Trochus)
 World Register of Marine Species

tuberculosus
Gastropods described in 1842